Macaranga bicolor is a species of plant in the family Euphorbiaceae. It is endemic to the Philippines.

References

Flora of the Philippines
bicolor
Vulnerable plants
Taxonomy articles created by Polbot
Plants described in 1865